Ambala Division is one of the six divisions of Haryana State of India. The division comprises the districts of  Ambala, Kurukshetra, Panchkula and Yamuna Nagar.

See also
Sil

References

Divisions of Haryana